Paya Sazeh Azarbaijan Rad Futsal Club (Persian: باشگاه فوتسال پایا سازه آذربایجان راد) is an Iranian Futsal club based in Tabriz.

Season-by-season 
The table below chronicles the achievements of the Club in various competitions.

First-team squad

References

External links
 Official Website (Persian)

Futsal clubs in Iran
Sport in Tabriz
Futsal clubs established in 2013
2013 establishments in Iran